SMS M85 was a M1916 type minesweeper built for the Imperial German Navy during the First World War by the Emden shipyard Nordseewerke, being launched on 10 April 1918 and entering service on 2 October that year. M85 survived the remainder of the war, and was passed on to the Reichsmarine, the navy of the Weimar Republic and then to the Nazi German Kriegsmarine. The outbreak of the Second World War saw M85 supporting the German invasion of Poland in September 1939, and she was sunk by a Polish mine on 1 October 1939 in one of the last acts of the Polish campaign.

Design and construction
The M1916 Type minesweeper was an improved and slightly enlarged derivative of the M1914 and M1915 Type minesweepers which Germany had built since 1914. They were fleet minesweepers, seaworthy enough to operate in the open sea, and proved to be successful and reliable in service.

As built, M85 had a main gun armament of two 8.8 cm (3.5 in) SK L/45 naval guns, while 30 mines could be carried. Post-war, most of the ships of the class were rearmed with a single 10.5 cm gun and three 2.0 cm anti-aircraft cannon. The ship had a crew of 40.

M85 was laid down at the shipbuilder Nordseewerke's Emden shipyard as yard number 110. She was launched on 10 April 1918 and entered service on 3 August 1918.

Service
M85 survived the remaining three months of the First World War. While the majority of the ships of the Imperial German Navy were interned at Scapa Flow and were scuttled on 21 June 1919, the German Navy's minesweepers remained under its control, although disarmed, as they were needed to help clear the extensive minefields in the North and Baltic Seas. When the Weimar Republic established the Reichsmarine, with its size constrained by the terms of the Treaty of Versailles, M85 was one of the ships taken over by the new navy. In 1931, M85 was noted as being in reserve.

M85 had returned to active service by 1 September 1939, when the German invasion of Poland started the Second World War, with M85 forming part of the newly established 7th Minesweeping Flotilla. On 4 September 1939, together with sister ships M75 and M84 assisted the minelayer  in laying a minefield at the southern end of the Øresund. The 7th Minesweeping Flotilla, including M85 was deployed to Polish waters on 5 September.

On 1 October 1939, shortly after the garrison of the Hel Peninsula had agreed to surrender, ending the Battle of Hel, M85 struck a mine north east of Jastarnia, which had been laid by the Polish submarine . 24 of M85s crew were killed, with the survivors rescued by the minesweeper M122 and several R boats. M85s crew were used to man two Polish minesweepers ( and ) that had been captured intact at Hel.

Notes

References

Bibliography
 
 
 
 
 
 
 
 

1918 ships
Ships built in Emden
Minesweepers of the Imperial German Navy
World War I minesweepers of Germany
World War II minesweepers of Germany
Maritime incidents in October 1939
Shipwrecks of Poland
Ships sunk by mines
World War II shipwrecks in the Baltic Sea